Suparno Satpathy is a socio-political leader from the state of Odisha. He is the great-grandson of Padma Bhushan Dr. Kalindi Charan Panigrahi and the grandson of Legendary Smt. Nandini Satpathy.

He is the Chairman of Smt. Nandini Satpathy Memorial Trust (SNSMT), a leading non-profit social cause organisation. From 2007 till 2012 he held the office of Convenor PMSA-Orissa, MoPR, Government of India

He was a part of the Indian National Congress Party from December 2006 until 21 March 2014. He joined Aama Odisha Party a day after resigning from the Congress. Suparno Satpathy unsuccessfully contested a seat representing Dhenkanal in the Lok Sabha, the lower house of Indian Parliament, in the 2014 Indian general election 

He is a lead member of the Netaji movement.

Shri. Satpathy is a columnist who writes about socio-political and environmental issues.

See also
 List of political families (India)

References

External links
 Smt. Nandini Satpathy Memorial Trust (SNSMT)
 The official website of Suparno Satpathy

1973 births
Living people
Odisha politicians
Candidates in the 2014 Indian general election
Indian National Congress politicians
Indian National Congress politicians from Odisha